Amarna letter EA 27 is a letter  addressed to Amenhotep IV and concerns "The Missing Gold Statues Again".

The letter is dated to a period within the very beginning of the second regnal year of the pharaoh, and was written by Tushratta, who was living at Washukanni. At the time the pharaoh was located at Thebes.

The letter is thought to contain a reference to a royal funeral.

See also
List of Amarna letters by size
Amarna letter EA 5, EA 9, EA 15, EA 19, EA 26, EA 27, EA 35, EA 38 
EA 153, EA 161, EA 288, EA 364, EA 365, EA 367

References

Amarna letters
Mitanni